Bertram Charles Ballard  (22 January 1903 – 15 July 1981) was an Australian public servant and diplomat.

Life and career
Ballard was born on 22 January 1903 in Toorak, Melbourne the eldest of three children in his family. He attended Scotch College and then the University of Melbourne, graduating with first-class honours.

Ballard joined the Commonwealth Public Service as Australian government solicitor in New Hebrides, Vanuatu in 1934. On 6 August 1940, Ballard was appointed Australia's first official representative in Nouméa, New Caledonia. He was tasked with encouraging war-time cooperation between New Caledonia and Australia and was also responsible for reporting to the Australian Government on economic and political affairs.

He applied for a job in the Department of External Affairs in 1943. In his first decade at the external affairs department, he was posted to Japan, the Dutch East Indies (now Indonesia), France, the Soviet Union and Switzerland.

In April 1952, Ballard was appointed Australia's first Minister to Thailand. He left for Bangkok that month to take up the posting.

In February 1955 the then External Affairs Minister appointed Ballard Australian Minister to Israel.

Ballard retired in 1967 from his final posting as Australian Ambassador to Sweden (1965–1967).

Ballard was appointed a Member of the Order of Australia in the 1981 Queen's Birthday Honours for "service to the public service as a diplomatic representative".

On 15 July 1981, Ballard died at Kew, Victoria.

References

1903 births
1981 deaths
Consuls-General of Australia in Noumea
Ambassadors of Australia to Israel
Ambassadors of Australia to Sweden
Ambassadors of Australia to Thailand
High Commissioners of Australia to Ghana
High Commissioners of Australia to Sri Lanka
Permanent Representatives of Australia to the United Nations Office in Geneva
University of Melbourne alumni
Members of the Order of Australia